Ruth Lupton is an English cricketer and former member of the England women's cricket team. She was born in 1964 and played one test, against New Zealand at Scarborough, and two one day internationals, both at the 1995 Women's European Cricket Cup.

References

External links
 

Living people
1964 births
England women Test cricketers
England women One Day International cricketers
Surrey women cricketers
Cricketers from Yorkshire